"Your Ma Said You Cried in Your Sleep Last Night" is a song performed by American singer Kenny Dino. It was Dino's only hit on the Billboard Top 40, debuting on that chart December 4, 1961, and peaking at number 24.

Doug Sheldon version 
Actor Doug Sheldon's cover version was also released in 1961. It reached number 29 on the UK singles chart in 1962.

Robert Plant version 
English rock singer Robert Plant also recorded a version of the song and included it on his 1990 album Manic Nirvana. It was released as a single and reached number 90 on the UK singles chart
and number 8 on the Billboard Mainstream Rock chart.

References

External links
 Cover versions

1990 singles
Robert Plant songs
Shakin' Stevens songs
1961 singles
1961 songs
Song recordings produced by Spike Stent